Yutthana Polsak (born 21 March 1970) is a Thai retired footballer. He represented Thailand at the 2000 and 2004 futsal world championships and the 2005 beach soccer world cup.

References

See also
Thailand Beach Soccer Team
Thailand Squad On Fifa.com

1970 births
Living people
Yutthana Polsak
Yutthana Polsak
Yutthana Polsak
1996 AFC Asian Cup players
Yutthana Polsak
Association football defenders
Southeast Asian Games medalists in football
Yutthana Polsak
Competitors at the 1997 Southeast Asian Games
Yutthana Polsak